(born November 25, 1985)  is a Japanese professional wrestler.

Career
After training with Dick Togo and debuting in one of his Super Crew events, Sato started working as an independent wrestler and wandered around Michinoku Pro Wrestling, Dramatic Dream Team, El Dorado Wrestling, Dragon Gate, Pro Wrestling Zero1 and Kaientai Dojo, in all of them wrestling under his true name. In March 2009, he was given in Michinoku Pro the gimmick of Kenbai, a traditional onikenbai dancer. He also became a member of Big Japan Pro Wrestling's undercard division.

In January 2022, however, after being unable to win the GHC Junior Heavyweight Tag Team Championship despite several shots, Haoh turned on Nioh, and on April 29 Haoh defeated Nioh in a "loser must change his name" match. On June 23, however, Haoh lost a "loser leaves town" match to Tadasuke, with which he took time off in order to return on an independent card in Tlalpan, Mexico, repackaged as Amakusa, a gimmick he kept upon returning to Japan and NOAH on November 11. On December 12, Amakusa defeated Dante Leon to win the GHC Junior Heavyweight Championship for the first time, and on March 9, 2023, he successfully defended the title against his former partner Hi69.

Championships and accomplishments

4 Front Wrestling
4FW Junior Heavyweight Championship (1 time)
Dramatic Dream Team
Ironman Heavymetalweight Championship (1 time)
Guts World Pro-Wrestling
GWC 6-Man Tag Team Championship (1 time) — with Dick Togo and Ryan Upin
Ice Ribbon
International Ribbon Tag Team Championship (1 time) – with Riho
Kaientai Dojo
Chiba Six Man Tag Team Championship(1 time) – with Hiro Tonai & Shiori Asahi
Kitakami 6-Man Tag Team Championship (1 time, current) – with Kengo Mashimo and Tank Nagai
Strongest-K Tag Team Championship (3 times) – with Hiro Tonai (1), Kengo Mashimo (1) and Tank Nagai (1)
UWA World Middleweight Championship (2 times)
Bo-so Golden Tag Tournament (2015) – with Tank Nagai
K-Survivor Tournament (2015) – with Kengo Mashimo, Tank Nagai and Yuma
Tag Team Match of the Year (2015) with Kengo Mashimo vs. Kotaro Yoshino and Taishi Takizawa
Tag Team Match of the Year (2017) with Tank Nagai vs. Kaji Tomato and Taishi Takizawa on April 23
Michinoku Pro Wrestling
Tohoku Tag Team Championship (1 time) – with Rasse
Bar Mimosa Cup (2007)
Michinoku Fairy Tale Cup (2009)
Pro Wrestling Noah
GHC Junior Heavyweight Championship (1 time)

References

External links
Profile at Kaientai Dojo official website

1985 births
Japanese male professional wrestlers
Living people
21st-century professional wrestlers
Tohoku Junior Heavyweight Champions
Tohoku Tag Team Champions
Ironman Heavymetalweight Champions
Strongest-K Tag Team Champions
UWA World Middleweight Champions